The 1998 Women's Rugby World Cup was the first world cup fully sanctioned by the International Rugby Board (IRB) and the third Women's Rugby World Cup in history. The tournament took place in Amsterdam, in the Netherlands and was the first women's world cup held outside of the United Kingdom.

The tournament saw a record 16 teams compete and heightened media attention. There was no qualification process, teams taking part by invitation from the IRB. New Zealand defeated the United States 44–12 in the final.

Several matches in the tournament were filmed for television and a one-hour TV highlights programme was produced by IMG. These recordings are held as part of the IRB's World Cup Archive.

Squads

Pool stages

Pool A

Pool B

Pool C

Pool D

Bowl

Quarter-finals

Semi-finals

11th/12th place

Final (9th place)

Shield

Semi-finals

15th/16th place

Final (13th place)

Cup

Quarter-finals

Semi-finals

3rd/4th place

Final

Plate

Semi-finals

7th/8th place

Final (5th place)

1998 Top scorers

See also
Women's Rugby World Cup
Rugby World Cup Sevens
Rugby World Cup

References

External links
 IRB coverage (via WebArchive)
 WRWC 1998 in Amsterdam
 Previous World Cup rugby results

 
1998
1998 rugby union tournaments for national teams
Rug
International rugby union competitions hosted by the Netherlands
1998 in women's rugby union
May 1998 sports events in Europe
1990s in Amsterdam
Women's Rugby World Cup, 1998